Lwo Shih-hsiung (born 23 May 1969) is a Taiwanese politician.

Early life and education
His father was Luo Chuan-chin. Lwo completed his primary and secondary education in Kaohsiung, Taiwan before earning a degree from National Cheng Kung University. He then completed some graduate work at National Sun Yat-sen University (NSYSU).

Political career
Lo was first elected in Kaohsiung 1st district in 2001, and won reelection for the same seat in 2004. In 2006, Lwo contested the Kuomintang nomination for the Kaohsiung mayoralty. The party backed Huang Chun-ying, and Huang lost to Democratic Progressive Party candidate Chen Chu. Lwo remained a member of the Legislative Yuan, and in May 2006, proposed a recall motion against president Chen Shui-bian that was rejected. His 2008 reelection bid featured the use of caricatures of himself as a bear. After Typhoon Morakot hit Taiwan in 2009, Lwo was named to a committee specially convened to handle disaster relief. He later became executive director of the Southern Taiwan Joint Services Center, under the purview of the Executive Yuan. It was announced that Lwo had resigned the position in October 2011.

References

1969 births
Living people
Kuomintang Members of the Legislative Yuan in Taiwan
Members of the 5th Legislative Yuan
Members of the 6th Legislative Yuan
Kaohsiung Members of the Legislative Yuan
National Sun Yat-sen University alumni
National Cheng Kung University alumni